Xiuping Community is a residential community in Yingxiu, Wenchuan County, Ngawa Tibetan and Qiang Autonomous Prefecture, Sichuan, China. As of 2021, the community has a population of 4,156 people, residing in 1,469 households. Approximately 70% of Xiuping Community is ethnically Han, with the remaining 30% being predominantly Tibetan, Qiang, and Hui.

History 
Much of Xiuping Community was built following the 2008 Sichuan Earthquake, when the Wenchuan County government built 479 homes to resettle those displaced by the earthquake.

Demographics 
Approximately 70% of Xiuping Community is ethnically Han, with the remaining 30% being predominantly Tibetan, Qiang, and Hui.

Many who live in Xiuping Community work in government agencies, schools, and for private corporations.

Culture 
In January 2021, the Xiuping Community government opened an activity center for the community's elderly population.

References 

Communities of China
Wenchuan County